Abdul Qadeer Baloch, better known as Mama Qadeer is a human rights activist from the Balochistan province of Pakistan.

Life

In 2013, Qadeer traveled more than 2,000 kilometers from Balochistan to Islamabad along with other Baloch men and women to protest against the issue of Baloch missing persons. Qadeer's own son, Jaleel Reki Baloch, had been found dead in 2012.

In March 2015, Qadeer was barred from leaving the country from Karachi Airport at the last minute. He was traveling to New York City to participate in a human rights conference to highlight the plight of Baloch people and the issue of missing Baloch persons.

On April 9, 2015, Qadeer was scheduled to give a talk titled "Unsilencing Balochistan" in an event at the Lahore University of Management Sciences. The event was cancelled at the last minute by the administration citing "order from government" as the reason behind the cancellation. The incident was followed by protests from the students and faculty of the institute against the "academic censorship".

Following the cancellation, an event titled 'Unsilencing Balochistan Take 2: In Conversation with Mama Qadeer, Farzana Baloch and Mir Mohammad Ali Talpur' was held at T2F Karachi.

Later on, in September 2015, Mama Qadeer was allowed to leave the Pakistan. After that he visited India in 2018. In an interview with Indian news channel, News 18, Mama Qadeer asked Indian government to provide them 'with weapons, so that they can kill their enemies'.

See also

 Insurgency in Balochistan
 Human rights in Pakistan
 Human rights violations in Balochistan

References

Human rights abuses in Pakistan
Living people
Baloch people
Pakistani human rights activists
People of the insurgency in Balochistan
Year of birth missing (living people)
Baloch nationalists